Mecistogaster martinezi is a species of damselfly in the family Pseudostigmatidae.

References

Further reading

 

Pseudostigmatidae
Articles created by Qbugbot
Insects described in 1985
Taxobox binomials not recognized by IUCN